is a Japanese term meaning "the actual place". Japanese detectives call the crime scene genba, and Japanese TV reporters may refer to themselves as reporting from genba. In business, genba refers to the place where value is created; in manufacturing the genba is the factory floor. It can be any "site" such as a construction site, sales floor or where the service provider interacts directly with the customer.

In lean manufacturing, the idea of genba is that the problems are visible, and the best improvement ideas will come from going to the genba. The gemba walk, much like management by walking around (MBWA), is an activity that takes management to the front lines to look for waste and opportunities to practice genba kaizen, or practical shop floor improvement. An important difference with MBWA is that Gemba Walks are not done randomly, but with a clear goal and often frequency and structure.

Glenn Mazur introduced this term into Quality Function Deployment (QFD, a quality system for new products where manufacturing has not begun) to mean the customer's place of business or lifestyle.  The idea is that to be customer-driven, one must go to the customer's genba to understand his problems and opportunities, using all one's senses to gather and process data.

Gemba walk
Gemba (aka Walkie Lookie) walks denote the action of going to see the actual process, understand the work, ask questions, and learn. It is also known as one fundamental part of Lean management philosophy. 

Taiichi Ohno, an executive at Toyota, led the development of the concept of the Gemba Walk. The Gemba Walk is an opportunity for staff to stand back from their day-to-day tasks to walk the floor of their workplace to identify wasteful activities. The objective of Gemba Walk is to understand the value stream and its problems rather than review results or make superficial comments. Along with Genchi Genbutsu or "Go, Look, See", Gemba Walk is one of the 5 Lean guiding principles that should be practiced by Lean leaders on a daily basis.
The gemba walk, is an activity that takes management to the front lines to look for waste and opportunities to practice gemba kaizen, or practical shopfloor improvement.

Application
The practice of regularly going to the Lean workplace to see the actual practices is known as gemba walking. Executives should expect to spend 45 to 60 minutes every week or two gemba walking with a Lean teacher, or Sensei, for six months to a year. Thereafter, they should regularly gemba walk on their own. Gemba walks are crucial to maintaining the disciplined adherence to Lean process designs, part of the Lean support role permeating all leadership positions.

Similarities

The term "going to the gemba" or, more appropriately, the Japanese term "genchi genbutsu" is also perceived to be comparable to management by walking around. The method bears much resemblance to the time and motion studies of Frederick Winslow Taylor, or even the more recent contextual inquiry and Contextual design methods, which are based in context-specific learning of work practices, in order to produce design-relevant process and product insights.

Differences 

Whereas Taiichi Ohno encouraged a focus on "going to the gemba," W. Edwards Deming suggested the need to look at the system, often referenced as "Production Viewed as a System". Deming's model of a system extends from suppliers, through an entire organization, to its customers, looping around with customer feedback.   As conceived by Deming, and first shared in Japan during his infamous 1950 visit, his feedback loop is fundamental to exploring opportunities for continual improvement throughout the system. The commonly used models of production associated with lean, such as "value-stream mapping," do not extend to include suppliers, customers, or include a feedback loop to foster continual improvement of the system.

Knowledge economy work application 

Because of the lack of physical products or machines processing them, knowledge-based work, e.g., scientific research, software development, or copywriting, is not typically associated with the Gemba practice. But given Taiichi Ohno's influence on Lean project management and the later transformation of manufacturing Kanban into Kanban for IT, it's not uncommon to meet software teams referring to their visual Scrum and Kanban boards as their Gemba. With the code managed in repositories, the state of each task and planned developments are only available for viewing on those workflow management boards.

See also
 Genchi Genbutsu

References

Quality management
Manufacturing in Japan
Japanese business terms